Cicero Creek may refer to:

Cicero Creek (Indiana)
Cicero Creek (Missouri)